Argyle is an unincorporated community in southwestern Lee County, Iowa, United States.    As of the 2020 census, its population was 91.  

It lies along the concurrent Iowa Highways 27 and 394 southwest of the city of Fort Madison, the county seat of Lee County.  Its elevation is 679 feet (207 m).  Although Argyle is unincorporated, it has a post office, with the ZIP code of 52619, which opened on the 15th of March, 1885. The community is part of the Fort Madison–Keokuk, IA-MO Micropolitan Statistical Area.

The Central Lee Community School District serves the community.

Demographics

References

Unincorporated communities in Lee County, Iowa
Unincorporated communities in Iowa
Fort Madison–Keokuk, IA-IL-MO Micropolitan Statistical Area